The Cité de l'Or ("The City of Gold") is an attraction located in Val-d'Or, in the Abitibi-Témiscamingue region of Quebec, Canada. It has been operating since 1995 as a place where people can see what gold mining was like by touring the underground Lamaque gold mine and the Bourlamaque historic mining village. Bourlamaque was declared a provincial historic site in 1979 and a National Historic Site in 2012.

In 1923, the gold deposit was discovered and in 1935, the mine came in operation. In 1985, it was exhausted and closed.

Cyclists must ride through the tunnels and up the access ramp (a 17% slope) before they race through the streets of Val-d'Or.

Since 2007, Cité de l'Or also became a training location for new miners.

Affiliations
The Museum is affiliated with: CMA,  CHIN and Virtual Museum of Canada.

See also 
 List of museums in Quebec
 Culture of Quebec
 Gold extraction
 Gold prospecting
 Placer mining
 Quartz reef mining

References

Mining museums in Canada
Val-d'Or
Museums in Abitibi-Témiscamingue